Ron Norris (10 September 1932 – 7 November 1984) was an Indian boxer. He competed in the men's welterweight event at the 1952 Summer Olympics. He was the lightweight champion of Madhya Pradesh and won the All-India championship in 1952. He was the son of Indian hockey player Rex Norris.

References

External links
 

1932 births
1984 deaths
Indian male boxers
Olympic boxers of India
Boxers at the 1952 Summer Olympics
Welterweight boxers
Anglo-Indian people
Indian emigrants to England
British people of Anglo-Indian descent